Pazhou station is a station on Line 8 of the Guangzhou Metro. It started operations on 28June 2003 and is located under Xingang East Road on Pazhou Island in the Haizhu District. near the Guangzhou International Convention Exhibition Center, the main venue for the Canton Fair.

Before the extension to both lines 2 and 8 opened in September 2010, this station ran as part of Line 2 as a single Line from Wanshengwei to Sanyuanli.

Station layout

Exits

References

Railway stations in China opened in 2003
Guangzhou Metro stations in Haizhu District